Datenna is a data intelligence platform company focusing on China. Datenna is located in Eindhoven. The company offers information services for investment screening, innovation intelligence and export control. Datenna also conducts research on European acquisitions by Chinese investors.

For example, Datenna research showed at the end of 2020 that the "Chinese government has a stake in 53% of Swiss companies acquired by Chinese firms since 2010." The Ultimate Beneficial Owner (UBO) in the Swiss acquisitions "is either part of the Chinese government, or the Chinese government has a substantial stake in the acquiring company but not a controlling one."

Datenna received Proof of Concept funding (soft loan) from the Netherlands Enterprise Agency, part of the Dutch government, in 2017.

References

 
International business
International macroeconomics
International factor movements
Economic geography
Property law
Securities (finance)
Stock market
Ownership